Midnight Sun is a 2011 compilation album by American jazz singer Dee Dee Bridgewater.

Background
The album is a collection of 11 love ballads and standards. Bridgewater explained "For years my fans and family have been asking me to compile a CD of my favorite love songs, and Midnight Sun is my ode to them. Love in all its glory – for better or for worse – as expressed by some of the most amazing songwriters of our time."

Reception
Thom Jurek of Allmusic wrote "Midnight Sun, issued by Decca/Emarcy, is a ballads collection of jazz and pop standards assembled from Dee Dee Bridgewater's recordings for Verve and other UMG-associated labels... As an album, these tracks -- all beautifully remastered -- hold together very well despite the variety of instrumental settings, and Bridgewater imbues them all with her consummate phrasing and intimacy."

Track listing

Chart positions

References

External links 

Dee Dee Bridgewater albums
2011 compilation albums